The first season of the American television series Hannibal premiered on April 4, 2013. The season is produced by Dino de Laurentiis Company, Living Dead Guy Productions, AXN Original Productions, and Gaumont International Television, with Sidonie Dumas, Christophe Riandee, Katie O'Connell, Elisa Roth, Sara Colleton, David Slade, Chris Brancato, Jesse Alexander, Martha De Laurentiis, and Bryan Fuller serving as executive producers. Fuller serves as the series developer and showrunner, writing or co-writing 10 episodes of the season. 

The series was given a 13-episode order in February 2012 and stars Hugh Dancy, Mads Mikkelsen, Caroline Dhavernas, Hettienne Park, and Laurence Fishburne. The series is based on characters and elements appearing in Thomas Harris' novels Red Dragon (1981), Hannibal (1999), and Hannibal Rising (2006) and focuses on the relationship between FBI special investigator Will Graham and Dr. Hannibal Lecter, a forensic psychiatrist that is secretly a cannibalistic serial killer. Each episode of the season is named after an element of French cuisine.

The season premiered on April 4, 2013 on NBC. The series premiere received 4.36 million viewers with a 1.6/5 ratings share in the 18–49 demographics. The season ended on June 20, 2013, with an average of 2.90 million viewers. The season received extremely positive reviews, with critics praising the performances, writing, visual style and its new take on the characters. In May 2013, NBC renewed the series for a second season.

Cast and characters

Main
 Hugh Dancy as Will Graham
 Mads Mikkelsen as Dr. Hannibal Lecter
 Caroline Dhavernas as Alana Bloom
 Hettienne Park as Beverly Katz
 Laurence Fishburne as Jack Crawford

Recurring 
 Scott Thompson as Jimmy Price
 Aaron Abrams as Brian Zeller
 Vladimir Jon Cubrt as Garrett Jacob Hobbs
 Kacey Rohl as Abigail Hobbs
 Lara Jean Chorostecki as Freddie Lounds
 Gillian Anderson as Bedelia Du Maurier
 Dan Fogler as Franklyn Froideveaux
 Mark Rendall as Nicholas Boyle
 Demore Barnes as Tobias Budge
 Anna Chlumsky as Miriam Lass
 Raúl Esparza as Dr. Frederick Chilton
 Eddie Izzard as Abel Gideon
 Ellen Muth as Georgia Madchen
 Gina Torres as Phyllis "Bella" Crawford

Notable guests
 Aidan Devine as Eldon Stammets
 Chelan Simmons as Gretchen Speck
 Molly Shannon as the Woman
 Cynthia Preston as Emma Buddish
 Ellen Greene as Mrs. Komeda
 Lance Henriksen as Lawrence Wells
 John Benjamin Hickey as Dr. Sutcliffe

Episodes

Production

Development
In September 2011, Gaumont International Television launched as an independent studio in Los Angeles. As part of its launch, the studio announced development on a project named Hannibal, which would cover the relationship between Will Graham and Hannibal Lecter, characters based on Thomas Harris' novels, with Bryan Fuller serving as developer, showrunner and executive producer. In November 2011, NBC acquired the series, with potential of ordering 13 episodes based on the strength of the pilot. When questioned about the dark nature of the character, NBC President Robert Greenblatt said, "it's part of the mix. I mean, look at Criminal Minds. That's a pretty dark show. I think it's dark with a bit of a... Well A, it's pre-sold. But it also has a kind of fantastical element to it, you know? It's a little mythic, that character."

In February 2012, NBC officially gave the series a 13-episode series order based on Fuller's script. One month later, David Slade joined as executive producer and to direct the pilot. Fuller commented on working on the series on network television rather than on cable, "doing a cable model on network television gives us the opportunity not to dally in our storytelling because we have a lot of real estate to cover."

Writing
Fuller felt attracted to the concept based on a sentence found in Red Dragon, where Lecter tells Graham "You caught me essentially because you're crazy, too." Hugh Dancy also explained the role of Graham in catching Lecter, "There clearly has to be some movement in that area because I'm playing the world's greatest detector of serial killers, and at a certain point you'd start to wonder how the hell I got the job. But at the same time, Hannibal is not just the most intelligent but, in a sense, the most quick-witted man in the show. He's always that one step ahead."

Fuller stated that the series would explore Lecter's life before his incarceration as depicted in Red Dragon, "the audience knows who Hannibal is so we don't have to overplay his villainy. We get to subvert his legacy and give the audience twists and turns." He also called the series a "love story" between Will Graham and Hannibal Lecter, "we'll get to the bottom of exactly what that means over the course of the first two seasons. But we're taking our sweet precious time."

The series was envisioned as an exploration of horror. Fuller said, "We're reflecting where people's heads are in a certain way and that's part of the arts' responsibility in its role in society. Entertainment has a very strange and cloudy mirror that it holds up to society."

Regarding the level of graphic violence in the series compared to other series on the air, Fuller explained that the novels and films "have a certain pedigree of crime horror/thriller, in order to be true to that genre, we had to have a certain amount of graphic content to honor the source material, and also honor the expectations of the audience who are approaching the material realizing this is a horror icon. If we didn't have certain ingredients for that dish, then it really wouldn't be that dish." Fuller added that NBC was supportive of the series, recognizing the series' importance in honoring the characters and the source material with the only restrictions being partial nudity. One instance of this happened on the fifth episode, "Coquilles", where the camera showed a naked murdered couple, posed in praying positions with the flesh of their backs opened and strung to the ceiling to give them the appearance of wings. NBC objected to the scene, citing that they "saw their butt cracks." To compensate, Fuller offered to add more blood to the scene and cover the cracks, which NBC accepted.

Casting

In March 2012, Hugh Dancy joined the series as Will Graham. Dancy already watched many of the films featuring Hannibal Lecter but was unfamiliar with Will Graham when he read the script. He said he was convinced to take the role after having a talk with Bryan Fuller where he detailed future seasons, "I realized that he had an enormous and expansive imagining of this world and the characters. From that conversation on, I was hooked."

In June 2012, Mads Mikkelsen was announced to play Hannibal Lecter. Mikkelsen viewed Anthony Hopkins' portrayal of Lecter "as close as you can come to the devil, to Satan". After meeting with Fuller, he accepted the role, quoting "Hamlet has been played so many times — to perfection — but that shouldn't stop anyone else from doing something else with Hamlet." Mikkelsen described his character, "if you're playing the bad guy, you have to find what you like about them. The character, in this case, is quite elaborate. He's an art collector, he loves the opera. He finds life beautiful, on the threshold of death." In December 2012, Anthony Hopkins was asked about him and he replied with an advice for Mikkelsen, "Play him as totally sane. Play him as ordinary. Don't try to be evil."

In July 2012, Laurence Fishburne joined as Jack Crawford, "the agent-in-charge at the Behavioral Science Unit of the FBI who is tasked with tracking down a certain flesh-eating serial killer." The next month, Caroline Dhavernas joined the series as Alana Bloom, "a psychiatric protege of Hannibal Lecter's who teaches psychology at Georgetown University and is consulting with the FBI on criminal profiling when she introduces her mentor to Jack Crawford." Later, Hettienne Park rounded up the main cast as Beverly Katz, "a bright-eyed yet weary crime scene investigator who specializes in working with fibers. She's part of a team of three who piece evidence together."

In August 2012, Aaron Abrams joined the series as Brian Zeller, "one of three crime scene investigators working with the agency." A few days later, Lara Jean Chorostecki joined in the recurring role of Freddie Lounds, who was described as "more sophisticated in her manipulations than her male predecessors, but no less daring, making her a foil for not only Will Graham, but Hannibal Lecter and Jack Crawford, as well." In September 2012, Scott Thompson joined to play Jimmy Price, "the third member of the FBI crime scene investigation team headed by Jack Crawford, the head of the FBI's behavioral science unit. Jimmy specializes in fingerprinting and spatter patterns at crime scenes." In October 2012, Gina Torres joined the series in the recurring role of Bella, Jack Crawford's wife. The next month, Raúl Esparza joined to play Frederick Chilton in a recurring role. The same day, Anna Chlumsky joined to portray Miriam Lass, "a young FBI trainee under the tutelage of Laurence Fishburne's Jack Crawford." In December 2012, Gillian Anderson joined to play an original character, Bedelia Du Maurier, Hannibal Lecter's therapist.

Among guest stars, Chelan Simmons appeared in "Amuse-Bouche" as Gretchen Speck, reprising her role from Fuller's series, Wonderfalls. Molly Shannon guest starred in "Oeuf" as the main antagonist, with her role being kept in secret when it was reported. Ellen Greene, having worked with Fuller on Pushing Daisies, appeared in "Sorbet" as Mrs. Komeda, "a novelist and member of Boston's cultural elite. She's also a pal of the titular cannibal, Dr. Lecter which should protect her from becoming his lunch." Lance Henriksen guest starred in "Trou Normand" as Lawrence Wells, the main antagonist of the episode. Ellen Muth, who worked with Fuller on Dead Like Me, appeared in "Buffet Froid" and "Relevés" as Georgia Madchen.

Filming
The season began filming on August 27, 2012.

Release

Broadcast
A few months after getting the 13-episode series order, NBC was reportedly considering having the show premiere as a mid-season replacement during the 2012–13 United States network television schedule. By January 2013, NBC considered having the series premiere at the end of the season or airing during the summer. In February 2013, NBC confirmed that the series would premiere on April 4, 2013, taking over the Thursday at 10:00pm timeslot held by the recently cancelled Do No Harm.

On April 29, 2013, KSL-TV, NBC's television station affiliate in Salt Lake City, announced that they would no longer air the series after receiving complaints from viewers, citing the series' "extensive graphic nature."

Episode removal
The fourth episode, "Oeuf", was scheduled to air on April 25, 2013. However, six days before the airing, the episode was pulled from the schedule at the request of Fuller, with the fifth episode, "Coquilles", airing instead. The episode was removed as a result of the Sandy Hook Elementary School shooting, which occurred four months prior. As the episode involved children being brainwashed to kill their families, Fuller said "I didn't want to have anyone come to the show and have a negative experience" with the episode. He further added, "it was the associations that came with the subject matter that I felt would inhibit the enjoyment of the overall episode. It was my own sensitivity." NBC later broke the episode into a webisode, with portions of the episode being available to watch on NBC.com. A few months later, the episode was available to watch on iTunes and Amazon Video.

In June 2013, Fuller was asked by Alan Sepinwall about his decision, he replied "in retrospect, it would have been fine to air, but at that time, I feel like that was the informed decision to be cognizant of what was happening in the nation regarding children and violence and particularly gun violence."

Marketing
In October 2012, the first images of the series were revealed. On February 16, 2013, a first poster and trailer for the series was released. On March 30, 2013, the cast and crew attended the 2013 WonderCon to promote the series and screen the first two episodes.

Home media release
The season was released on Blu-ray and DVD in region 2 on September 2, 2013, in region 1 on September 24, 2013, and in region 4 on September 25, 2013.

On June 5, 2020, the season was available for streaming on Netflix. It exited the service on June 4, 2021.

Reception

Viewers

Critical reviews
The season received extremely positive reviews from critics. On review aggregator website Rotten Tomatoes, the first season received an approval rating of 82% based on 67 reviews, with an average rating of 7.70/10. The site's critical consensus reads, "Hannibal caters to an intellectual audience that prefers plenty of gore in its psychological thrillers, with a polished presentation of madness." On Metacritic, the first season scored 70 out of 100 based on 32 reviews, which constitutes "generally favorable reviews".

Jeff Jensen of Entertainment Weekly gave the season an "A-" grade, writing "there is something to be said about caring about the internal lives of human beings and taking seriously the issue of how horror — fictional or all to real — impacts the imagination. In fact, Hannibal has been saying something about these murky matters all season long, and often quite artfully. My compliments to the chef." Emily St. James of The A.V. Club wrote, "Hannibal is a great show for other reasons but the thread uniting all of it is this fascination with death. Death is too often facile on television, a thing that happens to a guest character so the regulars can swoop in and save the day. Fuller, however, has been obsessed with death as long as he's been making television, and he's funneled that sensibility into a series that had every reason to be a cheap cash-in and has, instead, turned into one of TV’s best shows."

Critics' top ten lists
The season appeared in many "Best of 2013" lists.

Awards and accolades

References

External links 
 
 

Hannibal (TV series)
2013 American television seasons